The "sinking of the tugboat '13 de Marzo'" was an incident on July 13, 1994, where 37 Cubans who attempted to leave the island of Cuba on a tugboat deviated by its captain with the intention of requesting asylum in the United States drowned at sea.<ref name="AP1999">{{cite news |title=Survivor of "13 de Marzo tugboat sinking arrives in exile |url=http://fiu.edu/~fcf/13mar.html |access-date=October 27, 2022 |work=Tampa Bay Online |date=May 26, 1999 |archive-url=https://web.archive.org/web/20090429171534/http://fiu.edu/~fcf/13mar.html |archive-date=April 29, 2009 |via=Florida International Univ.|url-status=dead}}</ref> The Cuban archive project, a New York City based organization which promotes human rights in Cuba, has alleged that the Cuban coast guard deliberately sank the commandeered vessel and then refused to rescue some of the passengers. For their part, the Cuban government has denied responsibility, and stated that the boat was sunk by accident. Amnesty International said the following with regard to the involvement of the Cuban Government "there is sufficient evidence to indicate that it was an official operation and that, if events occurred in the way described by several of the survivors, those who died as a result of the incident were victims of extrajudicial execution."

Incident

On July 13, 1994, at approximately three in the morning, seventy two men, women, and children boarded the tugboat "13 de Marzo" (13th of March)''. With all vessels in Cuba owned by the state, it would have been illegal to acquire such a boat.

According to survivor María Victoria García, who resettled in the United States in 1999 thanks to a visa obtained for her by the Miami-based Cuban American National Foundation, the government vessels refused to provide assistance to some of the distressed passengers. As a result, only 31 survivors were pulled from the water.

Ms. García, whose ten-year-old son, husband, and other close family members died in the incident, has stated:

International leaders, including Pope John Paul II, made statements about the incident and expressed condolences to the victims.

See also
 Human rights in Cuba
 Censorship in Cuba
 Illegal emigration

References

External links
Amnesty International report  
Inter-American Court of Human Rights report on the incident

Mass murder in 1994
History of Cuba
Politics of Cuba
Human rights abuses in Cuba
Massacres in Cuba
1994 in Cuba
13 de Marzo
Deaths by drowning